Nirmala's Spice World is an American syndicated Cooking show from the United States. The half-hour-long primetime program is produced and  distributed in the U.S. by Veria.

This show also aired in Indian on Zindagi under the segment "Fursat Ke Pal".

Plot 

Nirmala's Spice World is a culinary adventure that takes the viewer into a world of exotic spices from around the globe. The "Queen of Spice," Nirmala Narine, opens her spice cabinet to reveal ancient secrets of spices that for generations have transformed plain dishes into unique and flavorful experiences. Each episode is dedicated to a single spice, and Nirmala shares recipes accentuated by both their exotic flavor and their curative properties. With an Ayurvedic approach, she unveils the secrets of how each featured spice not only flavors your food, but may also heal your body and mind.

References

External links 
Nirmala's Spice World Official Website
 

American television talk shows
2010s American cooking television series
2013 American television series debuts
First-run syndicated television programs in the United States